Xenophora solarioides is a species of large sea snail, a marine gastropod mollusc in the family Xenophoridae, the carrier shells.

Subspecies
 † Xenophora solarioides jezleri Cox, 1948

Description

Distribution

References

External links
 Reeve, L. A. (1843-1845). Monograph of the genus Phorus. In: Conchologia Iconica, or, illustrations of the shells of molluscous animals, vol. 1, pl. 1-3 and unpaginated text. L. Reeve & Co., London.

Xenophoridae
Gastropods described in 1845